Valeria Soledad Baroni (Born October 6, 1989 in Buenos Aires, Argentina), is an actress, singer, and dancer. She is best known for driving the Zapping Zone program that was broadcast throughout Latin America by Disney Channel. Her passion for music, singing, dancing and acting brought her to participate in High School Musical: The Challenge, a local version of American High School Musical, where she acted as one of the main characters.

Life and career 
In 2007, Baroni was selected to join the reality show High School Musical: The Selection, a casting which contained the actors who were part of the local version of the American musical, High School Musical.

Filmography

Television

References 

1989 births
Living people
Argentine female dancers
Argentine actresses